Bell Court is a neighborhood and historic district immediately southeast of Downtown Lexington, Kentucky, United States. Its boundaries are East Main Street to the south, Walton Avenue to the south, Midland Avenue to the north, and Boonesborough Avenue to the east.

Neighborhood statistics
 Area: 
 Population: 427
 Population density: 4,170 people per square mile
 Median household income: $55,512

References

External links
 Bell Court Neighborhood

Neighborhoods in Lexington, Kentucky
Italianate architecture in Kentucky
National Register of Historic Places in Lexington, Kentucky
Queen Anne architecture in Kentucky
Historic districts on the National Register of Historic Places in Kentucky